Eternal Melody is the first classical studio album by Japanese musician Yoshiki. It was released on April 21, 1993.

Overview 
In 1991, Yoshiki released his first album, classical compilation Yoshiki Selection, which included various classical works together with orchestral arrangements of songs by his band X Japan. In 1992, inspired by Keith Jarrett's album The Köln Concert, he began learning about jazz improvisation and orchestration.

Eternal Melody was recorded in February, 1993, at the Air Lyndhurst Hall recording studio in London, owned by English record producer Sir George Martin, and mastered at Abbey Road Studios.

Besides including orchestral arrangements of X Japan songs, the album also contains two new songs, "Overture" and "Amethyst."

Eternal Melody was followed by Eternal Melody II in 2005.

Release 
The album was released on April 21, 1993, by Toshiba-EMI. It reached number six on the Oricon charts in the first week of May, selling 83,740 copies. The following week, it dropped to number nine, with 31,940 copies sold, and in the third week it dropped to number fourteen, with 15,050 copies sold. In the fourth week, it dropped to number twenty five, selling 9,030 copies. The album charted for six weeks in total. It was re-released on December 27, 2001, by Polydor.

Single release 
On November 3, two singles written and co-produced by Yoshiki were released: "Amethyst" and "Ima wo Dakishimete", with the second being a karaoke adaptation of the second orchestral song from the first single, which wasn't included in the album.

The first single was released by Toshiba-EMI, as the single of London Philharmonic Orchestra, and co-produced by George Martin, while the second single was released by BMG Japan, and name credit went to TBS, as was the theme song for their drama Tetteiteki ni Ai wa..., and co-produced with drama director Endo Tamaki (from TBS).

In the third week of November, the singles reached number five and three on the charts, with sales of 74,740 and 85,610 copies, respectively. They charted for five and eighteen weeks, respectively. In 1994, "Ima wo Dakishimete" was the 35th annual best-selling single, with sales of 581,610 copies, and won the "Excellence award" at the 36th Japan Record Awards.

The song "Amethyst" was included in his second classical compilation, Yoshiki Selection II, and with "Ima wo Dakishimete" in his second classical studio album, Eternal Melody II.

Track listing

Recording personnel 
 Arrangers: George Martin, Gavin Greenaway, Graham Preskett
 Recording, mixing engineer: Bendoru Hayden
 Assistant engineers: Steve Orchard, Jeff Foster
 Mastering engineer: Chris Blair (Abbey Road Studios)
 Performed: London Philharmonic Orchestra

References 

1993 debut albums
1993 classical albums
Yoshiki (musician) albums
Albums produced by George Martin
Albums arranged by George Martin